Filip Šćrbec (born 3 June 1991) is a Croatian football midfielder, currently playing for Vinogradar. His older brother Lovro Šćrbec plays for NK Lokomotiva Zagreb.

Career
Šćrbec went through the youth ranks of NK Dinamo Zagreb until he moved with his brother Lovro to the youth team of NK Zagreb in 2006, playing several games for the Croatian U-16 national team in 2007. He was a part of the U-17 national team in 2008 but remained uncapped at that level. He returned to his former club in his last year as a junior team player, 2009, only to be sent to NK Lokomotiva Zagreb in January 2010, signing a stipend contract initially and then a 7-year professional contract in August 2010. Lokomotiva proceeded to send him on a season-long loan to the Druga HNL team NK Rudeš. In July 2011 his contract was mutually terminated and he moved to NK Inter Zaprešić.

External links
 

Statistics of Filip Šćrbec in Croatian national team in Official site of Croatian Football Federation:
 http://www.hns-cff.hr/?ln=hr&w=statistike&repka=U&id=14787&r=OK -

FILIP SCRBEC in Croatian national team U-18 years against Denmark on 2008:
 http://www.myfc.dk/user/index.php?klub_id=2037&sport=0&hold=0&page=3230&spec=&arkiv=5502
https://web.archive.org/web/20160304125807/http://www.zns.hr/images/stories/nogomet_br.22.pdf
https://web.archive.org/web/20160304133636/http://zns.hr/images/stories/nogomet_br.19_2011.doc

1991 births
Living people
Footballers from Zagreb
Association football midfielders
Association football fullbacks
Croatian footballers
Croatia youth international footballers
NK Lokomotiva Zagreb players
NK Rudeš players
NK Inter Zaprešić players
NK Vinogradar players
Croatian Football League players
First Football League (Croatia) players